The 2016 Sun Belt Conference men's soccer season was the 15th season of men's varsity soccer in the conference.

The Hartwick Hawks are both the defending regular season and conference tournament champions.

Changes from 2015 

 The Coastal Carolina Chanticleers are joining the conference after previously being part of the Big South Conference.
 The NJIT Highlanders, an associate member, are moving to the Atlantic Sun Conference.

Teams

Stadiums and locations 

 Arkansas State, Arkansas–Little Rock, Louisiana–Lafayette, Louisiana–Monroe, South Alabama, Texas State, UTA and Troy do not sponsor men's soccer. Hartwick and Howard are associated members.

Regular season

Results

Rankings

Postseason

Sun Belt Tournament

NCAA tournament

All-Sun Belt awards and teams

Key

 ASU = Applachain State
 CCU = Coastal Carolina
 GSTA = Georgia State
 GSOU = Georgia Southern
 HART = Hartwick
 HOW = Howard Fr. = Freshman
 So. = Sophomore
 Jr. = Junior
 Sr. = Senior
 Gr. = Graduate GK = Goalkeeper
 DF = Defender
 MF = Midfielder
 FW = Forward

See also 
 2016 NCAA Division I men's soccer season
 2016 Sun Belt Conference Men's Soccer Tournament
 2016 Sun Belt Conference women's soccer season

References 

 
2016 NCAA Division I men's soccer season